The following is a list of the longest private passenger vehicles of any global marque sold to individuals. The list includes light trucks as many SUV and other light-trucks rank among the world's longest passenger vehicles. This list does not include freight or public transport vehicles.

Longest vehicles

Longest Sedans

Current

Ceased Production (21st Century)

Longest Grand Tourers

Longest SUVs 

*The Defender 130's Length counts the spare wheel in the back of the vehicle.

Longest Pickup Trucks

See also
Articulated bus
Definition and list of full-size vehicles
Passenger vehicles in the United States
List of car manufacturers
Landyacht
 Longest road trains

References

Vehicle dimensions as found on New Car Test Drive

Automotive styling features
longest
Economy-related lists of superlatives
Transport-related lists of superlatives
Consumer road vehicles